Coleus graveolens, synonym Plectranthus graveolens, is a shrub in the family Lamiaceae. It is native to New South Wales and Queensland in Australia.

References

graveolens